Jan Šrail (born 18 December 1990) is a Czech cross-country skier. 

He represented the Czech Republic at the FIS Nordic World Ski Championships 2015 in Falun.

References

External links 
 

1990 births
Living people
Czech male cross-country skiers
Universiade bronze medalists for the Czech Republic
Universiade medalists in cross-country skiing
Competitors at the 2015 Winter Universiade